Samantha De Martin (born 17 August 1996) is an Australian professional wrestler, best known by the ring name Indi Hartwell. She is signed to WWE, performing on the NXT brand, and was a member of The Way. She is a former NXT Women's Tag Team Champion, as well as a former WSW Women's Champion and RCW Women's Champion.

Professional wrestling career

Early career 
De Martin began her training at the age of 19, and she was trained by Professional Championship Wrestling (PCW) Academy in Melbourne. Hartwell made her debut in March 2016, in her home country of Australia. She performed for several promotions like Melbourne City Wrestling, Shimmer, Rise, Riot City Wrestling, and World Series Wrestling.

WWE (2019–present) 
On 5 November 2019, it was reported that Hartwell signed a WWE contract. On 7 November 2019, she made her debut at a NXT live event. On the 15 January 2020 episode of NXT, she made her NXT televised debut by participating in the Number One Contender Battle Royal for the NXT Women's Championship, in which she lost. She would make an appearance on the 20 April episode of Raw in a lost by referee decision against Shayna Baszler after Baszler injured her arm. Following the match, Baszler sandwiched her arm in a ladder.

On the 15 July 2020 episode of NXT, Hartwell picked up her first televised win against Shotzi Blackheart. On 7 October, episode of  NXT, a storyline began where Hartwell gave a brand new television to the Garganos with a USB in the package, when she was seen assisting Candice LeRae in the Number One Contender Battle for the NXT Women's Championship at TakeOver 31 on 23 September. On Halloween Havoc, a masked figure wearing the Ghostface costume was seen assisting LeRae during her NXT Women's Championship match against Io Shirai but was fended off by the host of the event, Shotzi Blackheart. On 11 November, episode of NXT, it was revealed that Hartwell was the masked figure, aligning with LeRae in the process. On 9 December, episode of NXT, Johnny Gargano revealed that he had formed a faction with Candice LeRae, Austin Theory and Hartwell called The Way.

On 22 January 2021 episode of 205 Live, Hartwell and LeRae defeated the team of Cora Jade and Gigi Dolin in the quarterfinals of the Women's Dusty Rhodes Tag Team Classic, which marked the first time that a women's match has ever taken place in the history of 205 Live brand. On 10 February episode of NXT, they were eliminated by Ember Moon and Shotzi Blackheart in the semi-finals of the tournament. On 8 April, at TakeOver: Stand & Deliver, Hartwell and LeRae challenged Moon and Blackheart for the NXT Women's Tag Team Championship in a losing effort. On 27 April episode of NXT, Hartwell and LeRae attacked Blackheart and Moon; setting the stage for a future street fight match for the titles. On the next episode of NXT, they defeated the champions to win the NXT Women's Tag Team Championship, marking Hartwell's first championship in her WWE career. At The Great American Bash, the team of Io Shirai and Zoey Stark defeated Hartwell and LeRae, ending their reign at 63 days.

After months of promos with her onscreen boyfriend Dexter Lumis, Hartwell proposed to him on 17 August episode of NXT. On the debut episode of NXT 2.0, where the brand announced "new beginnings", she was the bride in a kayfabe wedding where she married her -now- on screen husband Lumis. At Halloween Havoc, Hartwell teamed with Persia Pirotta in a triple threat Scareway to Hell Ladder match against the Toxic Attraction (Gigi Dolin and Jacy Jayne) and the team of Shirai and Stark for NXT women's tag titles in a losing effort. She made an appearance on 12 November episode of 205 Live and defeated Valentina Feroz. In the following weeks, Hartwell and Pirotta started a feud with Toxic Attraction which resulted in a match for women's tag team titles at Vengeance Day where they were unsuccessful in winning the match. They then entered Women's Dusty Rhodes Tag Team Classic; losing in the first round against the team of Dakota Kai and Wendy Choo.

On 19 July episode of NXT, Hartwell competed in a 20-woman battle royal to determine the number one contender for the NXT Women's Championship, eliminating Arianna Grace but was eliminated by Tiffany Stratton. After losing to Blair Davenport on 23 August episode of NXT, Hartwell was reunited with Dexter Lumis and given an "I love you" letter before Lumis was taken by police. On 6 December episode of NXT, Hartwell defeated Fallon Henley and Wendy Choo in a triple threat match, earning a spot in the women's Iron Survivor Challenge at NXT Deadline. Four days later, at the event, Hartwell garnered a point over eventual winner Roxanne Perez. At New Year's Evil on 10 January 2023, Hartwell competed in a 20-woman battle royal to determine the number one contender to Perez's NXT Women's Championship, eliminating Lash Legend but was eliminated by eventual winners Toxic Attraction (Gigi Dolan and Jacy Jayne). On 28 January, Hartwell entered her first Royal Rumble match at the titular event, entering at number 26 and lasted for more than four minutes before being eliminated by Sonya Deville.

Other media 
De Martin made her video game debut in the Most Wanted Pack DLC for WWE 2K22 and as a regular playable character in WWE 2K23.

Personal life 
De Martin is of Chilean and Italian descent. She has stated that the match between Bayley and Sasha Banks at NXT TakeOver: Brooklyn inspired her to become a professional wrestler.

Championships and accomplishments 
 Battle Championship Wrestling
 BCW Women's Championship (1 time)
 BCW Women's Title Tournament
 Newcastle Pro Wrestling
 Newy Pro Women's Championship (1 time)
 Queen Of The Castle 2018
 Pro Wrestling Illustrated
 Ranked No. 83 of the top 100 female wrestlers in the PWI Women's 100 in 2020
 Riot City Wrestling
 RCW Women's Championship (1 time)
 World Series Wrestling
 WSW Women's Championship (1 time)
 WWE
 NXT Women's Tag Team Championship (1 time) – with Candice LeRae

References

External links 

 
 
 

1996 births
Living people
Sportspeople from Melbourne
Sportswomen from Victoria (Australia)
Australian female professional wrestlers
Australian expatriate sportspeople in the United States
Expatriate professional wrestlers
Australian people of Italian descent
Sportspeople of Italian descent
Australian people of Chilean descent
Sportspeople of Chilean descent
NXT Women's Tag Team Champions
21st-century professional wrestlers